Ohura Dam is an earthen dam located in Saga Prefecture in Japan. The dam is used for irrigation. The catchment area of the dam is 1.8 km2. The dam impounds about 7  ha of land when full and can store 730 thousand cubic meters of water. The construction of the dam was started on 1970 and completed in 1987.

References

Dams in Saga Prefecture
1987 establishments in Japan